The Prussian G 5.4 was a German goods train locomotive with a compound engine. Due to its top speed of 65 km/h it was also used on passenger services. The G 5.4, like the G 5.3, differed from the G 5.1 and G 5.2 in having a shorter wheelbase and higher boiler pitch. In addition, the Krauss-Helmholtz bogies enabled its riding qualities to be improved, especially at higher speeds. Between 1901 and 1910 a total of about 760 vehicles of the Class G 5.4 were built for the Prussian state railways. The last 25 locomotives were fitted once again with an Adams axle (see Prussian G 5.5).

Other railways companies also procured this class:
 Hafenbahn Frankfurt/M: 3 units in 1908, which were taken over by the Prussian state railways in 1910.
 Royal Prussian Military Railway: One locomotive in 1905, taken over by the Prussian state railways in 1919.
 Lübeck-Büchen railway: Three locomotives in 1906 and 1909, retired by 1936.
 Grand Duchy of Mecklenburg Friedrich-Franz Railway: Nine locomotives, actually G 5.5s, see Mecklenburg G 5.4.
 Imperial Railways in Alsace-Lorraine: Three locomotives in 1912, G 5.5, see Alsace-Lorraine G 5.5.

In 1923 the Reichsbahn took over 371 locomotives into its renumbering plan as 54 503-517 and 54 801-1156; in 1925 another 278 vehicles were incorporated as 54 801–981, 985-1079, 1083 and 1084. Some 22 examples were converted during the 1920s to superheated compounds. During the Second World War a number of G 5.4 and G 5.5 came into the Reichsbahn fleet from Poland and Lithuania as 54 1101-1218 and 54 1220-1223. The last G 5.4 in Germany was retired by 1951.

The vehicles were coupled with Prussian tenders of classes pr 3 T 12 or pr 3 T 15.

References

See also 
 List of DRG locomotives and railbuses
 List of Prussian locomotives and railbuses

2-6-0 locomotives
G 05.4
Standard gauge locomotives of Germany
Railway locomotives introduced in 1901
1′C n2v locomotives
Freight locomotives